West Wemyss  railway station served the village of West Wemyss , Fife, Scotland, from 1881 to 1949 on the Wemyss and Buckhaven Railway.

History 
The station was opened on 8 August 1881 by the Wemyss and Buckhaven Railway. To the opposite of the platform was a goods bank siding. A second platform was later added. The station closed temporarily on 1 January but reopened on 2 June 1919. At the east end was the signal box. It was replaced in 1921, being sited on the north side of the line, and closed in 1927. The station closed on 8 November 1949.

References 

Disused railway stations in Fife
Former North British Railway stations
Railway stations in Great Britain opened in 1881
Railway stations in Great Britain closed in 1949
1881 establishments in Scotland
1949 disestablishments in Scotland